Willow Creek Reservoir is a man-made lake in Elko County, Nevada in the United States. The reservoir was initially created in 1884 by the construction of Willow Creek Dam. Barrick Goldstrike owns the reservoir. The reservoir impounds the Willow Creek for irrigation storage.

References 

Dams in Nevada
Reservoirs in Nevada
Buildings and structures in Elko County, Nevada
Dams completed in 1884
Lakes of Elko County, Nevada
1884 establishments in Nevada